The Sukhoi Su-11 (NATO reporting name: Fishpot-C) was an interceptor aircraft used by the Soviet Union in the 1960s.

Design and development
The Su-11 was an upgraded version of the Sukhoi Su-9 ('Fishpot') interceptor, which had been developed in parallel with the OKB's swept wing Su-7 fighter bomber. Recognizing the Su-9's fundamental limitations, Sukhoi began work on the Su-11, which first flew in 1961 as the T-47 prototype.

The Su-11 shared the Su-9's delta wing, swept tailplanes and cigar-shaped fuselage, as well as the circular nose intake, but had a longer nose to accommodate the more powerful 'Oryol' (Eagle; NATO reporting name 'Skip Spin') radar set. A more powerful Lyulka AL-7F-1 turbojet was installed, providing 9.8 kN (2,210 lbf) more afterburning thrust for improved climb rate and high-altitude performance (and to compensate for increased weight). The Su-11 can be distinguished from the Su-9 by the external fuel pipes atop the fuselage, aft of the cockpit.

The Su-9's beam-riding K-5 missiles were replaced by a pair of R-98 (AA-3 'Anab') weapons, usually one R-98MR semi-active radar homing and one R-98MT infrared guided. Like many interceptors of the period, it had no cannon.

Production of the definitive Su-11-8M began in 1962, ended in 1965, after about 108 aircraft had been delivered, although it is believed that at least some Su-9s were upgraded to Su-11 form.

A conversion trainer version, the Su-11U 'Maiden,' was also developed ; Similar to the Su-9U, it had full armament and radar systems for training purposes, but the second seat reduced its already marginal fuel capacity and was not intended for combat use.

Operational history
Development problems and accidents delayed squadron introduction with the Soviet Air Force (VVS)/ Soviet Air Defence Forces (PVO) until 1964 and only small number of aircraft were delivered.

Even with the superior radar, the Su-11 remained heavily dependent on ground control interception (GCI) to vector its pilot onto targets. It had no capability against low-flying aircraft either, and Sukhoi OKB considered the Su-11 to be a misfire, much inferior to the far more formidable Su-15 ('Flagon'). Nevertheless, a few examples remained operational until the early 1980s. The last Su-11s left front-line service around 1983.

Operators

Soviet Air Defence Forces

Specifications (Su-11)

See also

References

External links

SU-11 Military Factory
Su-9/11 FISHPOT Global Security
Airwar.ru (RUS)

Su-11
1960s Soviet fighter aircraft
Single-engined jet aircraft
Delta-wing aircraft
Aircraft first flown in 1958
Low-wing aircraft